Marionia distincta is a species of sea slug, a dendronotid nudibranch, a marine gastropod mollusc in the family Tritoniidae.

Distribution
This species was described from station 315, the anchorage at Pulau Sailus Besar, Paternoster Islands (Tengah Islands) from a dredge with maximum depth of 36 m and a seabed of coral and Lithothamnion.

References

Tritoniidae
Gastropods described in 1905